Love Tracks may refer to:

 Love Tracks (Don McLean album), 1987
 Love Tracks (Gloria Gaynor album), 1978